TheMonmouthJournal.com is a daily, digital newspaper based in Monmouth County, New Jersey. The digital newspaper has three editions, the Eastern Monmouth County Edition, the Central Monmouth County Edition and The Northern Monmouth County Edition.

The Eastern edition covers ten towns in the Eastern Monmouth County area, including Red Bank, Middletown, Rumson, Fair Haven, Little Silver, Monmouth Beach, Sea Bright, Highlands, Shrewsbury, and  Atlantic Highlands.

The Central edition covers Long Branch, Allenhurst, Ocean Township, Tinton Falls, Colts Neck, Deal, Loch Arbour, Interlaken, Eatontown and West Long Branch.

The Northern Monmouth County Edition covers Holmdel, Hazlet, Matawan, Aberdeen, Union Beach, Keyport and Keansburg.

The news site covers hyper-local stories, maintaining an audience base that is looking for news stories about their local community.

The digital news site is owned by Monmouth News Media, LLC.

TheMonmouthJournal.com has a monthly readership of 150,000 readers at its three websites.

Coverage
TheMonmouthJournal.com is a free digital newspaper that covers local news in the "Two River" area of Eastern Monmouth County. The Eastern Monmouth County area encompasses those towns that border, or are near, the Shrewsbury River and Navesink River. A second website was launched in April 2021 that covers the Central Monmouth County area, while a third site covering Northern Monmouth County was launched in April 2022. The digital news site does not charge for any stories and there are never any firewalls demanding payment to read a story. The site is 100 percent free and supported by local and regional advertisers.

TheMonmouthJournal.com concentrates solely on the 29 towns it serves with hyper-local news coverage, as well as offering county and state news, obituaries, health news, school news and college dean’s list and graduation announcements, along with local business news.

External links
 Official website

https://www.themonmouthjournaleastern.com
https://www.themonmouthjournalcentral.com https://www.themonmouthjournalnorthern.com https://www.themonmouthjournal.com

Red Bank, New Jersey
Monmouth County, New Jersey
Newspapers published in New Jersey